General Chen Pao-yu (born 1958) is a Republic of China Army General who currently serves as the Chief of the General Staff of the Republic of China Armed Forces. Prior to his appointment,  Chief of the Army Staff Taiwan from April 2019 to July 2021 and served as the Vice Chief (Executive) of the General Staff in April 2017 to 2019.

Early life and education 
Born in Lienchiang County, Fujian Province, ROC, Chen graduated from Chinese Military Academy in 1980 (Class 69) and also attended the Infantry Captain course at the Army Command and Staff Course Class of 1994 (Class 83) and completed the Taiwan War College War Academy Class of 1999 (Class of 88). He also attended in various courses and received degrees from universities and military academies locally and abroad.

Military Background 
After graduating in the military academy in 1980, Chen held various posts in the Army and in the Armed Forces. He held various posts in the 129th Brigade, before leading various units such as the 295th Brigade, and also served as the Head of Army S3, the army's operations and planning division. Chen also served at the Combat Readiness Training Division, as the Deputy Commanding General 6th Army Corps in the country's northern areas, and as the Commanding General of Hua-Tung Defense Command in the country's southern areas. Chen also served as the Head of J3, the Office of the Deputy Chief of Operations and Planning Staff, the Chief of War Training Division at the Army Headquarters, and as the Commanding General of the 10th Army Corps in Central Taiwan.

In November 2017, he, along with other Navy and Defense Ministry officials was questioned by Tseng Ming-chung, along with other legislators of the Legislative Yuan, regarding the Qingfu mine hunting case, a scandal involving US company Lockheed Martin and Italian firm Intermarine S.p.A. on the acquisition of six mine countermeasure vessels for the Republic of China Navy for an undisclosed amount. In the aftermath of the 2018 Hualien earthquake, Chen served as the overall commander of overall humanitarian operations and assistance missions.

Chen was named as the Vice Chief (Executive) of the General Staff of the  Republic of China Armed Forces from 28 April 2017 to 1 April 2019, replacing Admiral Pu Tze-chun, where he was instrumental in the army's reforms to counter the People's Liberation Army's offensive strategies in times of war, as he launched the improvement of scientific training methods in order to improve soldiers' overall physical fitness, strengths and capabilities. On 1 April 2019, Chen served as the Commander of the Army, replacing General Wang Shin-lung. He served his position until July 2021, as Chen succeeded Huang Shu-kuang as Chief of the General Staff on 1 July 2021, making him the first general from the Matsu Islands to be named as the Chief of the General Staff.

Awards from military service
  Order of the Sacred Tripod with Special Cravat
  Order of the Cloud and Banner with Special Cravat
  2 Order of Loyalty and Diligence medals
  Medal of the Brilliant Light, A-Second Class 
  Medal of Victorious Garrison, A-First Class ribbon
  Medal of Army Brilliance, A Class 
   Medal of Outstanding Service, A Class
  4 Ribbons, Medal of Outstanding Staff, A Class
  4 Ribbons, Medal of Army Achievement, A Class

References

1958 births
Living people
Republic of China Army generals
People from Lienchiang County